Accelerator mass spectrometry (AMS) is a form of mass spectrometry that accelerates ions to extraordinarily high kinetic energies before mass analysis. The special strength of AMS among the mass spectrometric methods is its power to separate a rare isotope from an abundant neighboring mass ("abundance sensitivity", e.g. 14C from 12C). The method suppresses molecular isobars completely and in many cases can separate atomic isobars (e.g. 14N from 14C) also. This makes possible the detection of naturally occurring, long-lived radio-isotopes such as 10Be, 36Cl, 26Al and 14C. Their typical isotopic abundance ranges from 10−12 to 10−18. AMS can outperform the competing technique of decay counting for all isotopes where the half-life is long enough. Other advantages of AMS include its short measuring time as well as its ability to detect atoms in extremely small samples.

The method
Generally, negative ions are created (atoms are ionized) in an ion source. In fortunate cases, this already allows the suppression of an unwanted isobar, which does not form negative ions (as 14N in the case of 14C measurements). The pre-accelerated ions are usually separated by a first mass spectrometer of sector-field type and enter an electrostatic "tandem accelerator". This is a large nuclear particle accelerator based on the principle of a Tandem van de Graaff Accelerator operating at 0.2 to many million volts with two stages operating in tandem to accelerate the particles. At the connecting point between the two stages, the ions change charge from negative to positive by passing through a thin layer of matter ("stripping", either gas or a thin carbon foil). Molecules will break apart in this stripping stage. The complete suppression of molecular isobars (e.g. 13CH− in the case of 14C measurements) is one reason for the exceptional abundance sensitivity of AMS. Additionally, the impact strips off several of the ion's electrons, converting it into a positively charged ion. In the second half of the accelerator, the now positively charged ion is accelerated away from the highly positive centre of the electrostatic accelerator which previously attracted the negative ion. When the ions leave the accelerator they are positively charged and are moving at several percent of the speed of light. In the second stage of mass spectrometer, the fragments from the molecules are separated from the ions of interest. This spectrometer may consist of magnetic or electric sectors, and so-called velocity selectors, which utilizes both electric fields and magnetic fields. After this stage, no background is left, unless a stable (atomic) isobar forming negative ions exists (e.g. 36S if measuring 36Cl), which is not suppressed at all by the setup described so far. Thanks to the high energy of the ions, these can be separated by methods borrowed from nuclear physics, like degrader foils and gas-filled magnets. Individual ions are finally detected by single-ion counting (with silicon surface-barrier detectors, ionization chambers, and/or time-of-flight telescopes). Thanks to the high energy of the ions, these detectors can provide additional identification of background isobars by nuclear-charge determination.

Generalizations

The above is just one example. There are other ways in which AMS is achieved; however, they all work based on improving mass selectivity and specificity by creating high kinetic energies before molecule destruction by stripping, followed by single-ion counting.

History
L.W. Alvarez and Robert Cornog of the United States first used an accelerator as a mass spectrometer in 1939 when they employed a cyclotron to demonstrate that 3He was stable; from this observation, they immediately and correctly concluded that the other mass-3 isotope, tritium (3H), was radioactive. In 1977, inspired by this early work, Richard A. Muller at the Lawrence Berkeley Laboratory recognised that modern accelerators could accelerate radioactive particles to an energy where the background interferences could be separated using particle identification techniques.  He published the seminal paper in Science showing how accelerators (cyclotrons and linear) could be used for detection of tritium, radiocarbon (14C), and several other isotopes of scientific interest including 10Be; he also reported the first successful radioisotope date experimentally obtained using tritium. His paper was the direct inspiration for other groups using cyclotrons (G. Raisbeck and F. Yiou, in France) and tandem linear accelerators (D. Nelson, R. Korteling, W. Stott at McMaster).  K. Purser and colleagues also published the successful detection of radiocarbon using their tandem at Rochester.  Soon afterwards the Berkeley and French teams reported the successful detection of 10Be, an isotope widely used in geology. Soon the accelerator technique, since it was more sensitive by a factor of about 1,000, virtually supplanted the older "decay counting" methods for these and other radioisotopes. In 1982, AMS labs began processing archaeological samples for radiocarbon dating

Applications

There are many applications for AMS throughout a variety of disciplines. AMS is most often employed to determine the concentration of 14C, e.g. by archaeologists for radiocarbon dating. Compared to other radiocarbon dating methods, AMS requires smaller sample sizes (about 50 mg), while yielding extensive chronologies. MS technology has expanded the scope of radiocarbon dating. Samples ranging from 50,000 years old to 100 years old can be successfully dated through utilizing AMS.  An accelerator mass spectrometer is required over other forms of mass spectrometry due to their insufficient suppression of molecular isobars to resolve 13CH and 12CH2 from radiocarbon. Because of the long half-life of 14C decay counting requires significantly larger samples. 10Be, 26Al, and 36Cl are used for surface exposure dating in geology. 3H, 14C, 36Cl, and 129I are used as hydrological tracers.

Accelerator mass spectrometry is widely used in biomedical research. In particular, 41Ca has been used to measure bone resorption in postmenopausal women.

See also
 List of accelerator mass spectrometry facilities
 Arizona Accelerator Mass Spectrometry Laboratory

References

Bibliography

 
 

 
Mass spectrometry